is a railway station  in Sakai, in the town of Fujimi, Suwa District, Nagano Prefecture, Japan, operated by East Japan Railway Company (JR East).

Lines
Shinano-Sakai Station is served by the Chūō Main Line and is 178.2 kilometers from the terminus of the line at Tokyo Station.

Station layout
Shinano-Sakai Station has two unnumbered opposed side platforms connected by a footbridge. The station is unattended.

Platforms

History
The station opened on 1 November 1928. With the privatization of Japanese National Railways (JNR) on 1 April 1987, the station came under the control of JR East.

Passenger statistics
In fiscal 2015, the station was used by an average of 166 passengers daily (boarding passengers only).

Surrounding area

Sakai Post Office
Fujimi Minami Middle School

See also
 List of railway stations in Japan

References

External links

  

Railway stations in Nagano Prefecture
Chūō Main Line
Railway stations in Japan opened in 1923
Stations of East Japan Railway Company
Fujimi, Nagano